Sharon Township is a township in Clinton County, Iowa, USA.  As of the 2000 census, its population was 784.  Sharon Methodist Episcopal Church, which is located in the township, is listed on the National Register of Historic Places.

Geography
According to the USGS, it contains six cemeteries: Busch, Dickman, Lost Nation, Rustic Park, Sacred Heart and Smithtown.

References
 USGS Geographic Names Information System (GNIS)

External links
 US-Counties.com
 City-Data.com

Townships in Clinton County, Iowa
Townships in Iowa